Stripped Down is a live album by rock musician Rick Springfield. Released on February 24, 2015 as a CD/DVD set, it features 'stripped down' songs recorded live, including the new song "If Wishes Were Fishes".

Track listing

Charts

References

External links
 Rick Springfield Official Website

2015 albums
Rick Springfield albums